This Funk Is Made For Dancing was the second hit for disco band Broadway on the Hilltak Label. Composed, arranged and produced by Willie Henderson. It made both the Billboard and Cash Box charts in 1979.

Background
Broadway's album was in Billboard's "Recommended LPs" section in the magazine's March 17 issue. It got a positive review. The picks were "Magic Man", "This Funk Is Made For Dancing" and "Kiss You All Over". Released on Hilltak 7805, it was a Record World single pick in the B.O.S./Pop section in the March 3 issue with the reviewer calling it energetic and right with the vocals laid over a full track".

Chart
On April 7, the single entered the Cash Box Top 100 chart at #98. It peaked at #91 on the third week  (April 21) and stayed at the same spot the following week. It spent a total of six weeks in the chart.

On April 21, "This Funk Is Made for Dancing" peaked at #83. It spent a total of three weeks in the Billboard chart.

References

Hilltak Records singles
1979 singles